Football at the Summer Olympics has been included in every Summer Olympic Games as a men's competition sport, except 1896 (the inaugural Games) and 1932 (in an attempt to promote the new FIFA World Cup tournament). Since the first official tournament in 1908 in England, 99 hat-tricks have been scored in over 1,000 matches of the 25 editions of the tournament. The first hat-trick was scored by Vilhelm Wolfhagen of the Denmark, playing against France B in 1908; the most recent was by Rafa Mir of Spain, playing against Ivory Coast on 31 July 2020. The only Olympic Football Tournament not to have at least one hat-trick scored were the 	1976, 2008, and 2012 editions. The record number of hat-tricks in a single Olympic Football Tournament is twelve, during the Football at the 1928 Summer Olympics in the Netherlands, including three in the Bronze medal match as Italy defeated Egypt 11–3.

List

Notable Olympic Football Tournament hat-tricks 
Vilhelm Wolfhagen was the first player to score a hat-trick in an Olympic football match, on 19 October 1908, while playing for Denmark against France B.
Four players have scored two hat-tricks in Olympic football matches: Vilhelm Wolfhagen (all in 1928); Antonín Janda (both 1920); Domingo Tarasconi (both 1970); and Ferenc Bene (1964).
Only one player has scored three hat-tricks in Olympic football matches: Domingo Tarasconi (all in 1928). Tarasconi achieved that with 4 goals in the first round against United States, another 4 goals in the quarter-finals against Belgium, and three goals in the semi-finals against Egypt.
There has been only one occasion when three hat-tricks have been scored in the same match. It occurred during the Bronze medal match of the 1928 edition, when Italy defeated Egypt 11–3, and Angelo Schiavo, Elvio Banchero and Mario Magnozzi, all playing for Italy, scored three goals, with the later starting his only in the 72' minute. Furthermore, there have been twelve occasions when two hat-tricks have been scored in the same match, with the most recent occurring during the 2016 edition: when Germany defeated Fiji 10–0, and Nils Petersen and Max Meyer, both playing for Germany, scored 5 and 3 goals respectively.
The longest hat-trick to be completed (most time between the first and third goals), was scored by Kwame Ayew, who netted his first goal at 17', while the third goal came in extra time at 120+1'. Ayew achieved this feat in the 1992 Olympic Football Tournament, playing for Ghana against Paraguay in the quarter-finals.
The quickest hat-trick is Sophus Nielsen, who scored at 3', 4', and 6' in the 1908 Olympic Football Tournament, playing for Denmark against France in the semi-finals, and he went on to net more 7 times. This is also the briefest hat-trick to be completed (the shortest time between the first and third goals), as the time between his first and third a mere 3 minutes.
The only hat-trick scored by a substitute, is the one by Rafa Mir, in 2020 against Ivory Coast in the quarter-finals, he came-on in the 90+2' minute, and scored at 90+3', 117', and 120+1'.
Germany (incl. East and West Germany) holds the record for most hat-tricks scored with 11. The next closest is Yugoslavia with 8, and then Hungary and Italy with 7, closely followed by Argentina, Czechoslovakia, Denmark and Sweden with 5 each (Brazil and Great Britain have 4).
United States holds the record for most hat-tricks conceded with 7. The next closest is France (incl. France B) and Japan with 5, being closely followed by Egypt, Fiji, Germany (incl. West Germany), Mexico, South Korea and Yugoslavia (incl. Kingdom of SCS) with 4.

See also 

 Football at the Summer Olympics
 List of men's Olympic football tournament records and statistics

References 

Olympic football records and statistics
International football competition hat-tricks